Rajiv Mathur  is a 1972 batch IPS officer of Uttar Pradesh Cadre. He is a former Chief Information Commissioner of India. He served Uttar Pradesh Police since 1972 until becoming the Director of Intelligence Bureau. He also served as the Director of the Intelligence Bureau from January 2009 to December 2010.

About
He is an IPS officer of 1972 batch belonging to Uttar Pradesh Cadre. He served as SP in different districts of Uttar Pradesh before becoming Director General. He was posted as Director of Intelligence Bureau in 2009.

References

Year of birth missing (living people)
Living people
Indian civil servants
Directors of Intelligence Bureau (India)